Chum Darang is an Indian model, actress, social activist and entrepreneur from Pasighat of Arunachal Pradesh. She has won various beauty pageants.

Chum has a family of 6, her parents (Tajeep Darang and Yamik Dulom Darang) and 3 siblings, 2 younger brothers ( Tabit Darang and Ninong Darang) and 1 elder sister (Mitu Darang). She also successfully runs her own cafe called 'Cafe Chu' in Pasighat. She played a small role in the series, Paatal Lok. Darang is a social activist and was recognized by the Governor of Arunachal Pradesh for her work.

Beauty pageants
Darang's interest in beauty pageants started in 2007 when she was just 16 and a major turning point was her winning Miss AAPSU 2010. She later participated in various National and International beauty contests. She was one of the finalists of North East Diva 2014 and was the second Runner up at Miss Himalaya 2015.

Miss Earth India 2016
She participated in Miss Earth India 2016 contest which sends its winner to Miss Earth and won Miss Earth India Water 2016.

Miss Asia World 2017
She represented India in Miss Asia World 2017 beauty pageant, competing with contestants from 24 countries. She stood fifth and won the Miss Internet sub-title.

Miss Tiara India International 2017
She currently holds the crown of Miss Tiara India International 2017. She also won two subtitles "Miss Sports Gear" and "Miss Best National costume", defeating 28 contestants including participants from United States and Turkey.

Filmography

References

Living people
Indian beauty pageant winners
Miss Earth India delegates
People from East Siang district
Female models from Arunachal Pradesh
Actresses in Hindi cinema
Indian film actresses
1991 births